Uralochka-NTMK is a Russian women's volleyball club based in Yekaterinburg and currently plays in the Super League, the top Russian league. It was established in 1966 and is the most successful club in the USSR and Russian women's volleyball combined history with 25 national championship titles (11 Soviet and 14 Russian).

Previous names
 Uralochka Sverdlovsk (1966–1991)
 Uralochka Yekaterinburg (1991–2001)
 Uralochka-NTMK (2001–present)

History

Soviet years
In 1966 the Transport Engineering Sverdlov plant (now Uraltransmash) decided to create a women's volleyball team to represent Sverdlovsk Oblast. It was named  (an endearment form for Ural woman) and in December that same year it was allowed to compete at the national championship, Alexander Kilchevsky became the club's first coach.

During its first years, the results were inconsistent with the team being relegated and promoted and in 1969, Nikolay Karpol was appointed head coach and it was only by the end of the 1973 season when the club gained promotion to the highest USSR championship that results begin to become consistent. During the early and mid-1970s Dinamo Moscow was the dominant force in Soviet women's volley but Uralochka become very competitive and begin to challenge Dinamo's dominance. By the late 1970s the club won its first national title (in 1978) and went on to win the national titles for another four consecutive seasons (1979, 1980, 1981, 1982). European success came next, the club started to assert itself as a European force by winning the CEV Champions League for three consecutive years (1980–81, 1981–82, 1982–83) and the Cup Winners Cup of 1985–86. A first national Cup title came in 1986, during the same season another national championship was won, with another five consecutive ones arriving in the following seasons (1987, 1988, 1989, 1990 and 1991). Two more cups (in 1987 and 1989) and three CEV Champions league (in 1986–87, 1988–89 and 1989–90) were added and by the time of the dissolution of the Soviet Union, the club had established itself as one of the strongest teams in the continent.

Russian years
The club would dominate the newly created Russian Women's League winning the tournaments first 14 seasons (from 1991–92 to 2004–05), which when added to the titles of the last 6 seasons of the USSR makes the club the national championship winner for 20 consecutive years. In the European competitions, the club has reached the semifinal or later stages of the CEV Champions league in six consecutive seasons (from 1991–92 to 1996–97) winning the title in two occasions (1993–94 and 1994–95).

In 2001 the club was renamed , with NTMK standing for Nizhniy Tagil Iron and Steel Works (literally "Nizhny Tagil Metallurgic Kombinat").

Venues
The club has two venues in which to play.
 Metallurg-Forum, in Nizhny Tagil, 3,200 spectators capacity.
 Palace of Sporting Games "Uralochka" (DIVS), in Yekaterinburg, 5,000 spectators capacity.

Honours

National competitions
USSR
  USSR Championship : 11 
1978, 1979, 1980, 1981, 1982, 1986, 1987, 1988, 1989, 1990, 1991

  USSR Cup: 3 
1986, 1987, 1989

Russia
  Russian Super League: 14
1991–92, 1992–93, 1993–94, 1994–95, 1995–96, 1996–97, 1997–98, 1998–99, 1999–00, 2000–01, 2001–02, 2002–03, 2003–04, 2004–05

International competitions
  CEV Champions League: 8
1980–81, 1981–82, 1982–83, 1986–87, 1988–89, 1989–90, 1993–94, 1994–95

  Cup Winners Cup: 1
1985–86

Team Roster
Season 2020–2021, as of November 2020.

Notable players

  Irina Kirillova
  Yevgeniya Artamonova
  Marina Babeshina
  Yekaterina Gamova
  Yelena Godina
  Irina Ilchenko
  Valentina Ogiyenko
  Marina Pankova
  Maria Perepelkina
  Lyubov Sokolova
  Irina Tebenikhina
  Elizaveta Tishchenko
  Yelena Tyurina
  Yelena Vasilevskaya
  Irina Zaryazhko
  Aksana Kavalchuk
  Strashimira Filipova
  Mia Jerkov
  Rosir Calderón
  Nancy Carrillo
  Yaima Ortíz
  Yumilka Ruiz
  Sinead Jack
  Anastasiya Kodirova

Uralochka 2
In 1983 the club created another team, which on its own right became competitive, winning the USSR Cup in 1988, finishing second once in the USSR Championship and finishing the Russian Championship five times in second and five times in third places. In 2003, Uralochka 2 effectively became the second team to support youth players and provide players to the main team.

Over the years it has played under various names (Yunezis, Uraltransbank, Aeroflot-Malachite, Aeroflot-Uraltransbank, Uralochka 2 - Ural State Technical University, Uralochka 2 - USUE).

References

External links
Uralochka-NTMK official website 

Russian volleyball clubs
Volleyball clubs established in 1966
1966 establishments in Russia
Sports clubs in Yekaterinburg